"Don't Be Shy" is a song by Dutch DJ Tiësto and Colombian singer-songwriter Karol G. It was released on 12 August 2021 via Atlantic Records as a
the second single from Tiësto's forthcoming seventh studio album Drive. It also marks Karol G's first song in English.

Critical reception
Nancy Gomez of EDM Tunes wrote that the track "comes with an energizing and joyful vibe to bring the madness to the dancefloor or any virtual event."

Music video
The music video was directed by Christian Breslauer, who filmed the music videos for "The Business", "Industry Baby" and "Streets". It starts off with an outdoor shot of the Norwegian National Opera and Ballet at the Night, then followed up by the Night at the Museum-inspired music video, comedian Blake Webber plays a museum janitor, and Karol G dances with a group of dancers in different scenes in a museum.

Part two of the music video was released on 4 September 2021.

Credits and personnel
Credits adapted from Tidal.

 Teemu Brunila – producer, keyboard, programing, writer
 Tiësto – producer, writer
 Dave Kutch – masterer
 Rob Kinelski – mixer
 Karol G – writer
 Jonas David Kröper – writer
 Yoshi Breen – writer

Charts

Weekly charts

Year-end charts

Certifications

Release history

References

2021 songs
2021 singles
Tiësto songs
Karol G songs
Songs written by Tiësto
Songs written by Karol G
Songs written by Teemu Brunila
Atlantic Records singles